Fred Lennon may refer to:

 Alfred Lennon (1912–1976), father of English musician John Lennon
 Fred A. Lennon (1905–1998), American manufacturer and philanthropist